Mladen Mladenov (born 10 March 1957) is a Bulgarian former wrestler who competed in the 1980 Summer Olympics.

References

External links
 

1957 births
Living people
Olympic wrestlers of Bulgaria
Wrestlers at the 1980 Summer Olympics
Bulgarian male sport wrestlers
Olympic bronze medalists for Bulgaria
Olympic medalists in wrestling
Medalists at the 1980 Summer Olympics
20th-century Bulgarian people
21st-century Bulgarian people